Chelcie Lynn is an American YouTuber, actress and stand-up comedian, who began her internet career on the video sharing platform Vine as her character "Trailer Trash Tammy". She posted her first original Vine in 2013 and moved to YouTube to continue sharing content after the platform was discontinued in 2017.

Career

Inception, Vine, and YouTube career (2013–2017) 
She began her career on the video-sharing platform Vine, and began posting in 2013.

Lynn created her signature character Trailer Trash Tammy, in 2013. The character is meant to depict a redneck, trailer trash woman living in the Southern United States.

Lynn created her YouTube channel on March 30, 2015.

In 2016, she began doing mukbang videos from a car as her character, Trailer Trash Tammy. Mukbanging is a popular style of vlogging in which the vlogger eats on camera, and interacts with the audience. She has collaborated with controversial mukbang YouTuber Nikocado Avocado.

As Vine's shutdown was announced in October 2016, Lynn began posting to YouTube more frequently as it served as an alternative for Vine. Vine was officially discontinued on January 17, 2017.

Accolades, collaborations and major developments (2019–present) 
In 2019, Lynn and Luke Bryan collaborated to prank Bryan's mother, Caroline, into thinking that he was being attacked by an obsessed fan (Tammy) for Luke's 12 Days of Prankmas.

In June 2021, she was listed on Variety Magazine's Top 10 Comics to Watch for 2021.

Stand-up comedy career 
In 2019, she began traveling performing stand-up comedy in various Comedy clubs and venues.

Lynn has popularized other acts in both her YouTube videos and stand-up events, including Libbie Higgins; who portrays Tammy's fictional cousin "Crystal", and Justin Armistead, who also portrays Tammy's fictional cousin "Gem".

Filmography

Movies

Skits

See also
 White trash
 Trailer trash
 Rednecks
 List of YouTubers

References

External links

 
 Trailer Trash Tammy's official website
 

Living people
Comedy YouTubers
American comedians
American actresses
21st-century American women
Year of birth missing (living people)